Alexander Ronald Gordon was Provost of St Andrew's Cathedral, Inverness.

Gordon was born in 1949, educated at the University of Nottingham and the College of the Resurrection, Mirfield. After curacies in Headingley and Fareham he held incumbencies in Cudworth, Lairg, Brora and Dornoch. He was the Anglican Chaplain at Strasbourg from 2002 until his appointment as Provost.

Notes

1949 births
Alumni of Edinburgh Theological College
Provosts of Inverness Cathedral
Living people
Brora